IAV GmbH Ingenieurgesellschaft Auto und Verkehr, (literal Engineer Society Automobile and Traffic), abbreviated to IAV GmbH, is an engineering company in the automotive industry, designing products for powertrain, electronics and vehicle development.  Founded in Berlin in 1983 by Prof. Dr. Hermann Appel as a university-affiliated research institute, the company employs over 8,000 members of staff, and supplies automobile manufacturers and component suppliers.  In addition to development centres in Berlin, Chemnitz and Gifhorn, IAV operates at sites in France, United Kingdom, Spain, Sweden, China, Japan, South Korea, Brazil and the United States.

Clients include the Volkswagen Group, BMW, PSA Peugeot Citroën, Fiat, Ford Motor Company, General Motors, Porsche and Toyota.  Component manufacturer clients include Robert Bosch GmbH, Delphi, Continental AG and ZF Group.

Shareholders
 the shareholders of IAV GmbH were:
Volkswagen AG - 50%
Continental Automotive GmbH - 20%
Schaeffler Technologies AG & Co. KG - 10%
IAV GmbH - 10%
SABIC Innovative Plastics B.V. - 10%

Subsidiaries
IAV has the following worldwide subsidiary companies:
Europe
Consulting4Drive GmbH
IAV S.A.S.U. (France)
IAV Cars GmbH
IAV U.K. Ltd.
IAV Fahrzeugsicherheit GmbH & Co. KG
TRE GmbH
CPU 24/7 GmbH
IAV Automotive Engineering AB (Sweden)

Asia
IAV Automotive Engineering (Shanghai) Co. Ltd.
IAV Co., Ltd. (Japan)
IAV Korea Co., Ltd.

North / South America
IAV Automotive Engineering Inc. (USA)
IAV do Brasil Ltda.

In-road electric vehicle charger 
In 2009 the company submitted a patent for an electric vehicle recharger that is built into the road. The technology would allow electric vehicles to be charged as they drive over roads embedded with a recessed wireless recharging strip, using electromagnetic induction.

See also 
 Ground-level power supply

References

External links
IAV.com official international portal

Automotive companies of Germany
Automotive engineering
Electric vehicle industry
Charging stations
Companies established in 1983
Volkswagen Group
Companies based in Berlin